Sajjan (15 January 1921 – 17 May 2000) was a Bollywood and stage actor. He acted in several plays and movies from the 1950s to the 1980s. His best known films are Bees Saal Baad, Chalti Ka Naam Gaadi, April Fool, Rail Ka Dibba, Johny Mera Naam and Jhumroo.

Early life
Born on January 15, 1921, in Jaipur, his full name was Sajjan Lal Purohit, but he was known by his first name in the Indian film industry. Sajjan graduated from Jaswant college in Jodhpur. He had a desire to be a lawyer, but not an actor.

Career
In 1941, he arrived in Calcutta and worked as an apprentice in a laboratory of the East India Company. His initial breakthrough in films was as an extra in films such as Masoom (1941) and Chowringhee (1942). Sajjan left Calcutta during te Second World War and reached Mumbai where he worked as an assistant to the famous director Kidar Sharma. At that time, the great showman Raj Kapoor was also an assistant to Sharma. He also worked as assistant to Gajanan Jagirdar and Vakil Sahib and received Rs.35 as salary.

A poet by heart, Sajjan showed his talent when he wrote dialogues for Meena (1944) and lyrics for Door Chalen (1946) and Dhanyavad (1948). He also acted in small roles in Prithvi Theatre. His acting debut film was Dhanyavad. After that, Bombay Theatre's Muqaddar was released in 1950. The heroine was Nalini Jaywant.

By then Sajjan was well established in films. In the 1950s and 1960s, he acted as hero or side-hero in films such as Saiyan, Rail Ka Dibba, Bahana, Sheesha, Malkin, Nirmohi, Kasturi, Mehmaan, Lagan, Girl School, Paridhaan, 00 Dulhe, Ghar-Ghar Mein Diioali, Haa-Haa-Hee-Hee-Hoo-Hoo, Poonam Jhanjhar and Halla-Gulla. As hero, his last films were Kabuliwala and Do Chor, and as an artist he last appeared in the 1986 release Shatru with Rajesh Khanna.

An artist of more than 150 films, Sajjan also worked in TV serials. In Vikram Aur Betaal he played Betaal. His other serial was Lena-Dena.

Filmography

Television

References

External links
 
 Sajjan's interview

1921 births
2000 deaths
Male actors in Hindi cinema
Indian male film actors
20th-century Indian male actors